40S ribosomal protein S15 is a protein that in humans is encoded by the RPS15 gene.

Ribosomes, the organelles that catalyze protein synthesis, consist of a small 40S subunit and a large 60S subunit. Together these subunits are composed of 4 RNA species and approximately 80 structurally distinct proteins. This gene encodes a ribosomal protein that is a component of the 40S subunit. The protein belongs to the S19P family of ribosomal proteins. It is located in the cytoplasm. This gene has been found to be activated in various tumors, such as insulinomas, esophageal cancers, and colon cancers. As is typical for genes encoding ribosomal proteins, there are multiple processed pseudogenes of this gene dispersed through the genome.

References

Further reading

External links 
 PDBe-KB provides an overview of all the structure information available in the PDB for Human 40S ribosomal protein S15

Ribosomal proteins